Galsan Tschinag (born Irgit Şınıkay oğlu Çuruk-Uvaa, 26 December 1944 in Bayan-Ölgii Province, Mongolia), is a Mongolian writer of novels, poems, and essays in the German language, though he hails from a Tuvan background. He is also often described as a Shaman, and is also a teacher and an actor.

Life
Born in the upper Altai Mountains in western Mongolia, the youngest son of a Tuvan shaman, Galsan majored in German studies at the Karl Marx University in Leipzig, East Germany (1962-1968). He did his thesis work under Erwin Strittmatter, and upon graduation began to work as a German teacher at the National University of Mongolia. In 1976 his teaching license was revoked because of his "political untrustworthiness". He continued to work twelve-hour shifts, shuttling between all four of the Mongolian universities. In 1980, at the age of 36, Galsan was diagnosed with a life-threatening heart condition. He later recovered from the condition and credits his "shamanic powers" and plenty of exercise for saving his life.

Today, the author spends most of the year at his home in the Mongolian capital city of Ulan Bator, together with his family of nearly 20. He also spends much time giving readings in the German-speaking world and across Europe, as well as seeking to get closer to his Tuvan roots in the western Mongolian steppes. Though he still writes mainly in German, his books have been translated into many other languages. In addition to his writing, Galsan is an activist for the Tuvan minority and practices shamanistic healing.

Works in English

 2004 All the Paths Around Your Yurt (online poetry translation from Alle Pfade um deine Jurte, 1995)
 2004 You Will Always Be Untamable (online poetry translation from Nimmer werde ich dich zähmen können, 1996)
 2004 Cloud Dogs (online poetry translation from Wolkenhunde, 1998)
 2004 Oracle Stones as Red as the Sun: Songs of the Shaman (online poetry translation from Sonnenrote Orakelsteine, 1999)
 2004 The Stone Man at Ak-Hem (online poetry translation from Der Steinmensch zu Ak-Hem, 2002)
 2006 The Blue Sky: A Novel (translation in print from Der blaue Himmel, 1994)
 2007 Beyond the Silence (online poetry translation from Jenseits des Schweigens, 2006)
 2007 The Gray Earth (translation in print from Die graue Erde, 1999)
 2013 Wind of the Steppe, Wind of the World (online poetry translation from Steppenwind, Weltenwind, 2013)

Works in German

(with tentative English titles)
 1981 "Eine tuwinische Geschichte und andere Erzählungen" (A Tuvan Story and other short stories)
 1993 "Das Ende des Liedes" (The End of it)
 1994 "Der blaue Himmel" (The Blue Sky)
 1995 "Zwanzig und ein Tag" (Twenty-One Days)
 1996 "Nimmer werde ich dich zähmen können" (Never Will I Tame You)
 1997 "Die Karawane" (The Caravan)
 1997 "Im Land der zornigen Winde" (In the Land of the Angry Winds, with co-author Amelie Schenk)
 1997 "Der siebzehnte Tag" (The Seventeenth Day)
 1999 "Die graue Erde" (The Grey Earth)
 1999 "Der Wolf und die Hündin" (The Wolf and the Bitch)
 2000 "Der weiße Berg" (The White Mountain)
 2001 "Dojnaa"
 2002 "Tau und Gras" (Dew and Grass)
 2004 "Das geraubte Kind" (The Stolen Child)
 2007 "Die neun Träume des Dschinghis Khan" (The Nine Dreams of Genghis Khan)
 2008 "Die Rückkehr" (The Return)
 2011 "Das andere Dasein" (A Second Existence)
 2012 "Gold und Staub" (Gold and Dust)
 2013 "Der Mann, die Frau, das Schaf, das Kind" (The Man, the Woman, the Sheep, the Child)

Awards 
1992 Adelbert-von-Chamisso-Preis
1995 Puchheimer Leserpreis
2001 Heimito von Doderer-Literaturpreis
2003 Danish Aloa Literature-Preis
2006 was recognized as a deserving cultural worker in Mongolia
2009 European Trebbia-Preis
2002 Bundesverdienstkreuz
2012 City of Marburg Literaturpreis
2015 Literatur Work Award for "Gold and Dust", "The Man, the Woman, the Sheep, the Child" and "My Altai"
2018 Highest award of the Republic of Tuva (Russia)

References

External links
 Images of Migration and Change in the German-language Poetry of Galsan Tschinag by Richard Hacken (pdf)
 The Poetry of Galsan Tschinag: An Introduction
 Friends of Altai
 "Das edle, gute Deutschland wird fortbestehen", by Wolfgang Harrer a.k.a. Blau and Alysa Selene, ZDF (in German, audio)
 Galsan Tschinag in der ZDF Mediathek (video in German)
 Galsan Tschinag's Website (German)

Bibliography
 Galsan Tschinag: A Searchable Bibliography

1944 births
Living people
People from Bayan-Ölgii Province
Tuvan people
Mongolian writers
German-language writers
Leipzig University alumni
Recipients of the Cross of the Order of Merit of the Federal Republic of Germany
Academic staff of the National University of Mongolia
Tengrist religious workers
Shamans